For Bird and Bags is an album by American jazz saxophonist Eddie Harris recorded for the Vee-Jay label but released on Exodus when Vee-Jay was struggling financially. The album was also released on the Buddah label as Sculpture in 1969.

Reception
The Allmusic review states "Throughout, Harris (whose mastery of the extreme upper register and immediately recognizable sound are both quite impressive) is in excellent form".

Track listing
All compositions by Eddie Harris except as indicated
 "Salute to Bird" – 8:47 
 "I'm As Happy As I Want To Be" – 5:35 
 "The River Nile" – 5:00 
 "Salute to Bags" – 9:57 
 "Samba de Orfeu" (Luiz Bonfá, Antônio Carlos Jobim) – 2:50 
 "Only the Lonely" (Sammy Cahn, Jimmy Van Heusen) – 3:42 
 "Checkmate" (John Williams) – 4:50

Personnel
Eddie Harris – tenor saxophone, piano
Charles Stepney – piano, vibes
Willie Pickens – piano
Joe Diorio, Roland Faulkner – guitar
Melvin Jackson – bass
Marshall Thompson – drums

References 

Eddie Harris albums
1965 albums
Exodus Records albums